Nsawam Adoagyiri is one of the constituencies represented in the Parliament of Ghana. It elects one Member of Parliament (MP) by the first past the post system of election. Nsawam Adoagyiri is one of the constituencies created from the now defunct Aburi-Nsawam constituency in the Eastern Region of Ghana.

Boundaries
The seat is located entirely within the Akuapem South Municipal Assembly of the Eastern Region of Ghana.

Members of Parliament

See also
List of Ghana Parliament constituencies
Akuapim South Municipal District

References

Parliamentary constituencies in the Eastern Region (Ghana)